Lingtsang  was formerly one of the Kham region's five independent kingdoms of Tibet. The realm of Lingstang was incorporated into the People's Republic of China in 1950 following the Battle of Chamdo.

Geography

The Kingdom of Lingtsang was centred around the eponymous region of Ling or Lingtsang, in the Tibetan region of Kham, though its exact extent is unknown. The region of Lingtsang is located north of Derge, along the upper reaches of the Yangtze River (known as "Dri Chu" in Tibetan); it makes up the southern portion of today's Sêrxü County.

History

The region of Lingtsang first rose to prominence during the era of the  Tibetan Empire, where the capital at that time, Denkok was the centre of Kham's population and cultural activity. After the collapse of the Tibetan Empire, Lingtsang next rose to prominence under the Sakya domination of Tibet; however, the semi-legendaey King Gesar is also supposed to have been a ruler of Ling (an alternative name for Lingtsang), and in 1216, forces of the kingdom apparently looted the monastery of Tshurbu, which was located near Lhasa. Additionally, the later ruling family of Lingtsang claimed descent from Gesar's half-brother.

At this point, a monk and head of the local dynasty was given overlordship over the district of Domé (modern Amdo), and Sakya administrators were located at Lingtsang.  After the end of Sakya dominion in Tibet, Lingtsang became an independent kingdom. The Ming Dynasty opened diplomatic relations with the kingdom of Lingtsang in the early 15th century to ensure the safety of caravans entering Tibet through Kham; as part of this move, the ruler was granted the honors of "State Master of Consecration" and "Religious King of Promoting Goodness".

By the 1600s, Lingtsang had become powerful enough to exercise control over the rival kingdom of Derge; however Derge became increasingly powerful starting from around 1630. This was at Lingtsang 's expense, which meant that from 1700 onwards, Lingtsang was a small and unimportant state on the border of Derge. During the Qing rule of Tibet, Lingtsang's leaders (who were no longer monks) were assigned the status of tusi. The kingdom came to an end when the province of Sichuan instituted Chinese rule in 1909; it became part of Derge.

References

See also 
 Kham
 Lingtsang Gyalpo

History of Tibet
Former countries in Chinese history